Seven Years in Tibet is a 1997 American biographical war drama film directed by Jean-Jacques Annaud. It is based on Austrian mountaineer and Schutzstaffel (SS) sergeant Heinrich Harrer's 1952 memoir Seven Years in Tibet, about his experiences in Tibet between 1944 and 1951. Seven Years in Tibet stars Brad Pitt and David Thewlis, and has music composed by John Williams with a feature performance by cellist Yo-Yo Ma.

In the film, Harrer (Pitt) and fellow-Austrian Peter Aufschnaiter (Thewlis) are mountaineering in 1930s British India. When World War II begins in 1939, their German citizenship results in their imprisonment in a prisoner-of-war camp in Dehradun in the Himalayas. In 1944, Harrer and Aufschnaiter escape the prison and cross the border into Tibet, traversing the treacherous high plateau. There, after initially being ordered to return to India, they are welcomed at the holy city of Lhasa and become absorbed into an unfamiliar way of life. Harrer is introduced to the 14th Dalai Lama, who is still a boy, and becomes one of his tutors. During their time together, Heinrich becomes a close friend to the young spiritual leader. Harrer and Aufschnaiter stay in the country until the Battle of Chamdo in 1950.

Plot
In 1939, Austrian mountaineer Heinrich Harrer leaves behind his pregnant wife to join Peter Aufschnaiter in a team attempting to summit Nanga Parbat in British-ruled India (now part of Pakistan). When World War II begins in 1939, they are arrested by the British authorities for being enemy aliens.  They are imprisoned in a prisoner-of-war camp in Dehradun in the Himalayan foothills, in the present-day Indian state of Uttarakhand. Harrer's wife, Ingrid, who has given birth to a son he has not seen, sends him divorce papers from Austria, by then annexed by Nazi Germany.

In 1944, Harrer and Aufschnaiter escape the prison and cross into Tibet. After being initially rejected by the isolated nation, they manage to travel in disguise to the Tibetan capital city of Lhasa. There, they become the house guests of Tibetan diplomat Kungo Tsarong. The Tibetan senior official Ngawang Jigme also extends friendship to the two foreigners with gifts of custom-made Western suits. Aufschnaiter falls in love with the tailor, Pema Lhaki and marries her. Harrer opts to remain single, both to focus on his new job of surveying the land and avoid experiencing another failed relationship.

In 1945, Harrer plans to return to Austria upon hearing of the war's end. But his son Rolf sends him a cold letter in which he says that Harrer is not his father. This stops Harrer from leaving Tibet. Soon afterwards, Harrer is invited to the Potala Palace and becomes the 14th Dalai Lama's tutor in world geography, science, and Western culture. Harrer and Dalai Lama end up befriending each other.

Meanwhile, political relations with the new Communist government of China sour as they make plans to invade Tibet. Ngawang Jigme leads the Tibetan army at the border town of Chamdo to halt the advancing People's Liberation Army. However, he ends up surrendering and blows up the Tibetan ammunition dump after the one-sided Battle of Chamdo.

During the treaty signing, Kungo Tsarong tells Harrer that if Jigme had not destroyed the weapons supply, the Tibetan guerrillas could have held the mountain passes for months or even years; long enough to appeal to other nations for help. He also states that, for Tibetans, capitulation is like a death sentence. As the Chinese occupy Tibet, Harrer condemns Ngawang Jigme for betraying his country, declaring their friendship over. Out of anger, Harrer further humiliates the senior official by returning the jacket that Ngawang Jigme gave him as a present, a grave insult in Tibetan culture; as well as by throwing him onto the ground before storming off.

Harrer tries to convince the Dalai Lama to flee, but he refuses; not wanting to abandon his people. The Dalai Lama encourages Harrer to return to Austria and be a father to his son. After the enthronement ceremony, in which the Dalai Lama is formally enthroned as the spiritual and temporal leader of Tibet, Harrer returns to Austria in 1951.

Harrer's son, Rolf, refuses to meet him at first, but Harrer leaves a music box that the Dalai Lama gave him and this piques the boy's interest. Years later, Harrer and Rolf (now a teenager) are seen mountain-climbing together, suggesting that they have mended their relationship.

Cast

 Brad Pitt as Heinrich Harrer
 David Thewlis as Peter Aufschnaiter
 BD Wong as Ngapoi Ngawang Jigme
 Mako as Kungo Tsarong
 Danny Denzongpa as Regent
 Victor Wong as Chinese 'Amban'
 Ingeborga Dapkūnaitė as Ingrid Harrer
 Jamyang Jamtsho Wangchuk as Dalai Lama Tenzin Gyatso, 14 years old
 Sonam Wangchuk as Dalai Lama, 8 years old
 Dorjee Tsering as Dalai Lama, 4 years old
 Lhakpa Tsamchoe as Pema Lhaki
 Jetsun Pema as The Great Mother
 Ama Ashe Dongtse as Tashi
 Ric Young as General Chang Jing Wu
 Ven Ngawang Chojor as Lord Chamberlain
 Duncan Fraser as British Officer

Production
After the Chinese Communist Party pressured the Indian government to threaten to cut electricity to the set and refuse to allow the film to set up a banking account, production shifted from Ladakh to Argentina. The city of La Plata had the railway station where Heinrich leaves for Unserberg is the main station of La Plata and  the Mendoza Province in such places as the Andes mountains. After the film was released, the director confirmed that two crews secretly shot about 20 minutes of footage for the movie in Tibet. Other footage was shot in Nepal, Austria and Canada.

Music

Comparisons between the film and the book

The film has a number of significant differences from the book. At the beginning of the film, Harrer, who notably climbed the north face of the Eiger in 1938, is hailed as a "German hero", and replies: "Thank you, but I'm Austrian." To have said that in 1939 would have been extremely bold, since Austria had been part of Greater Germany since the Anschluss of April 1938. In the book, Harrer says nothing about any such remark. Additionally, during the scene at the train station, Harrer appears hostile to the Nazi Party, taking the Nazi flag with reluctance. The real-life Heinrich Harrer was in fact a Nazi Schutzstaffel NCO, and stated in his 1938 book that as a member of the German Alpine Association: "We climbed up the North Face of Eiger over the summit and up to our führer."

The film makes Harrer's son a key theme, but in the book, Harrer does not mention his wife or son. He had in fact been married and divorced, as the film shows, but his ex-wife's new husband was killed during the war and Harrer's son was raised by his ex-wife's mother. In his autobiography, Harrer gives details of his contact with his son, but nothing to support what the film shows. In the book, Harrer says there was little to tie him to his home as one of the reasons for staying in Tibet and not returning to Europe.

The pre-invasion visit of Chinese Communist negotiators to Lhasa, arriving at an airfield constructed by Tibetans, and their departure for China after a brief conference with their Tibetan counterparts—including the desecration of the sand mandala as well as the "religion is poison" remark as depicted in the film, do not occur in the book or in any of the numerous histories that have been written about the matter. China's destruction of several thousand Tibetan temples and monasteries and Tibetan Buddhist texts occurred during the Chinese Cultural Revolution (1966–76).

There was no air link until Lhasa Gonggar Airport was constructed in 1956—when the Dalai Lama visited Beijing in 1954, he used the still-incomplete road system.

The whole sequence of negotiations and the installation of the Dalai Lama as ruler are out of sequence. Tenzin Gyatso, 14th Dalai Lama was enthroned as the temporal leader of Tibet on 17 November 1950. After the Chinese crossed the Jinsha River and defeated the Tibetan army in October 1950, a Tibetan delegation was sent to Beijing and agreed on the Seventeen Point Agreement for the Peaceful Liberation of Tibet. Meanwhile, the Dalai Lama left Lhasa and took refuge on the border with India and Sikkim. The Dalai Lama disliked the agreement. He returned to Lhasa, and for several years tried to work within its terms.

Release
Seven Years in Tibet premiered on September 13, 1997, at the 1997 Toronto International Film Festival before a commercial release on October 8, 1997, in the United States and Canada where it opened in 3 theaters, grossing $46,130 in its first two days. The film was distributed to 2,100 more theaters for the weekend where it grossed $10,020,378. After its run, the film grossed $37,957,682 domestically and $93,500,000 overseas with an overall box office gross of $131,457,682.

Critical reception
Based on 36 reviews collected by Rotten Tomatoes, the film received a 58% approval rating, with an average score of 6.2/10. The site's consensus states: "Seven Years in Tibet tells its fascinating true-life story with a certain stolid grace, even if it never quite comes to life the way it could." Metacritic, which assigns a normalized rating in the 0–100 range based on reviews from top mainstream critics, calculated an average score of 55, based on 18 reviews.

Roger Ebert of the Chicago Sun-Times acclaimed the film generally, stating that "Seven Years in Tibet is an ambitious and beautiful movie with much to interest the patient viewer, but it makes the common mistake of many films about travelers and explorers: It is more concerned with their adventures than with what they discover." Ebert believed the film was told from the perspective of the wrong character and thought the casting of Pitt and Thewlis should have been reversed. Derek Elley of Variety praised the film's overall production value but thought: "for a story with all the potential of a sweeping emotional drama set in great locations, too often you just long for the pic to cut loose from the ethnography and correct attitudes and go with the drama in old Hollywood style."

Chinese Communist Party reaction

As the film was being released, it was condemned by the government of the People's Republic of China, which stated that Communist Chinese military officers were intentionally shown as rude and arrogant, brutalizing the local people. The Chinese government also decried the film's positive portrayal of the 14th Dalai Lama. All future films produced by Sony were banned from playing in China, sending a chilling message that the party would punish studios and their parent companies that made movies it didn't like even if they weren't ever planned for release in China. Annaud, Pitt, and Thewlis were initially banned from ever entering China. However, Annaud was since welcomed back to China in 2012 to chair the jury of the 15th annual Shanghai International Film Festival. In addition, Pitt subsequently visited China in 2014 and 2016.

Sony also took measures outside the film to try and appease the Communist Party such as inviting Chinese filmmakers onto their lot in order to boost their exposure, lobbying for China to become a member of the World Trade Organization, and traveling on an apology tour with executives around China in order to be able to resume business in China by 1998.

Accolades

See also
 Chinese censorship abroad
 Film censorship in China
 Kundun, another 1997 film depicting the Dalai Lama during his youth.
 List of TV and films critical of the Chinese Communist Party
 1938–39 German expedition to Tibet, an actual state-sponsored expedition into Tibet by the Nazi Party to which Heinrich Harrer was an SS Oberscharführer.

References

External links
 
 
 
 
 The Wild Things of God: Seven Years in Tibet
 Seven Years in Tibet, credits for this film entered into the Cannes Film Festival in 1956

1997 films
1990s adventure drama films
1990s biographical drama films
1990s war drama films
American adventure drama films
Adventure films based on actual events
American biographical drama films
American war drama films
British adventure drama films
British biographical drama films
British war drama films
1990s English-language films
1990s German-language films
Mountaineering films
1990s Hindi-language films
Mandarin-language films
Tibetan-language films
Films directed by Jean-Jacques Annaud
Films with screenplays by Becky Johnston
Films scored by John Williams
Drama films based on actual events
Films based on non-fiction books
Films set in Austria
Films shot in Argentina
Films shot in Canada
Films shot in China
Films shot in Nepal
Films about Tibet
Mandalay Pictures films
TriStar Pictures films
Films shot in Tibet
Films shot in Austria
Films shot in Chile
Films about the 14th Dalai Lama
1997 drama films
Films set in the British Raj
Films set in Dehradun
Films set in India
Film controversies in China
Film controversies in Tibet
Religious controversies in film
1990s American films
1990s British films